Composite odontoma is a rare defect in humans in which a benign tumor forms in the mouth, generally as a result of the abnormal growth of a single tooth, causing additional teeth to form within the tumor. Most cases have been found in the upper jaw of patients. Unchecked growth of the tumor can make swallowing and eating difficult, and can also lead to grotesque facial swelling.

In most cases, surgery is required to remove the extra teeth and tumorous tissue. Prior to 2014, the maximum recorded number of teeth removed in such an operation was 37. However, in July 2014 Ashiq Gavai, a 17-year-old boy in India, suffered from an extreme case of composite odontoma in his lower jaw, which required the removal of more than 232 teeth altogether. The surgery was performed by Dr. Sunanda Dhiware at Sir J. J. Hospital in Mumbai, India. In July 2019, a 7-year-old boy in India had surgery to remove the 526 teeth that were in a "bag" in his lower jaw. The surgery was performed at the hospital of Chennai.

References 

Developmental tooth disorders